The Bastard Baronetcy, of Kitley in the County of Devon, was a title intended to be created in the Baronetage of Great Britain in September 1779 for William Bastard (1727–1782) in recognition of his actions in saving the arsenal of Plymouth from a French fleet in August of that year. The title was gazetted but Bastard declined to assume it and it did not ever pass the Great Seal.

Family tree

|-
|style="text-align: left;"|Notes:

References

Bastard of Kitley, A Genealogical and Heraldic History of the Extinct and Dormant Baronetcies of England Ireland and Scotland,  John Burke, Sir Bernard Burke, second edition, John Russell Smith, London 1844, page 44,

Extinct baronetcies in the Baronetage of Great Britain